Georges Auguste (born 1933 in Petit-Goâve) is a Haitian painter. Auguste paints scenes of rural Haitian life in vibrant color. His style is known as "Raw Art".

References
 

1933 births
Haitian painters
Haitian male painters
Living people
Date of birth missing (living people)
People from Ouest (department)
20th-century Haitian male artists